Long Beach  is a small community south east of Clarenville in Trinity Bay on the island of Newfoundland. Long Beach was the last recorded community in Southwest Arm to be settled, in 1865, when settlers came to live there from Grates Cove. The Post office first opened in 1889 and the first Postmaster was M.H. Vey. Some of the surnames that were residents of Long Beach were: Abbott, Fry, Harris, King, Vey, Barfitt and Quinton.

See also
 List of communities in Newfoundland and Labrador

Populated places in Newfoundland and Labrador